Herston is a western suburb of the town of Swanage, in Dorset, England. It has its own railway station – Herston Halt railway station – on the Swanage Railway. There is a park on Days Road. The Swanage School is in this area.

References

External links

Swanage